Azcapotzalco is a borough (alcaldía) of Mexico City.

Azcapotzalco may also refer to:

Azcapotzalco (former administrative division), a former municipality of the Mexican Federal District
Azcapotzalco (altepetl), a pre-Columbian polity
Azcapotzalco metro station, a Mexico City Metro station